Acrassus or Akrassos was an ancient Roman and Byzantine-era city in Lydia (modern Turkey). in the Roman province of Asia and Lydia.
 Apparently, it is the same place that Ptolemy calls Nacrasa or Nakrasa, placed on the road from Thyatira to Pergamum.

It was in the upper valley of the Caicus River, at or near İlyaslar, but its exact site is not located.
 
Acrassus minted its own coins.

Bishopric
Acrassus was also the seat of a bishopric and remains a titular diocese of the Roman Catholic Church in the ecclesiastical province of Sardis.  It is named after the ancient city and the current bishop is Đura Džudžar.

Known bishops
 Albert-Léon-Marie Le Nordez  Auxiliary Bishop of Verdun (France)  June 25, 1896 – November 28, 1898  
 Leopoldo A. Arcaira  Auxiliary Bishop of Zamboanga Auxiliary Bishop of Malolos (Philippines)  November 6, 1961 – November 23, 1994  
 Đura Džudžar, auxiliary bishop of the Greek Catholic Eparchy of Mukachevo (3 March 2001), Exarch of the Greek Catholic Apostolic Exarchate of Serbia and Montenegro (23 August 2003), Exarch of the Greek Catholic Apostolic Exarchate of Serbia (19 January 2013), later Eparch of the Greek Catholic Eparchy of Ruski Krstur (6 Décember 2018).

References

Catholic titular sees in Asia
Dioceses established in the 1st century
Greek colonies in Anatolia
Ancient Greek archaeological sites in Turkey
Populated places in ancient Lydia
Former populated places in Turkey
Populated places of the Byzantine Empire
Roman towns and cities in Turkey
Lost ancient cities and towns
History of Manisa Province